William North (July 13, 1794 – January 3, 1872) was a well known civic leader in Lowell, Massachusetts, for whom the William North Lodge, A.F. & A.M. was named.

Early life
He was born in Wethersfield, Connecticut, to Salmon North and Jerusha Leeds. His paternal grandfather, Isaac North was a lieutenant in the Revolution. 
William joined the Methodist Church in Goshen, Connecticut, in 1815.

Time in Lowell
He came to Lowell in 1834. In Lowell, he was a member of the Chapel Hill Methodist Church. He was a founder of St. Paul's Methodist Church, where he was a trustee, and remained active  for many years. The church building is now the United Teen Equity Center. 
In Lowell, William North was overseer of the Dyeing at the Middlesex Manufacturing Company. He was a member of the Board of Aldermen, the School Committee, and the vice president and director of the City Institution for Savings. He was also a member of the Lowell City Council, and the Massachusetts State Legislature.

He was a master of three lodges; Seneca Lodge in Torrington, Connecticut, Libanus Lodge in New Hampshire, and Pentucket Lodge in Lowell. He was also Deputy Master of the Grand Lodge of Massachusetts and Senior Grand Warden of the same lodge.

Family life
He married Laura Hyde (1792-1847) of Oxford, Connecticut. She was the daughter of Nathan Hyde and Sally Thorpe, and sister of Orson Hyde. 
Their children were Caroline Laura North (1819-1899), William Leeds North (1821-1882), and Frederick Thorpe North (1828-1873). Caroline Laura North married the Reverend William Rice, and they named a son William North Rice.

Genealogy
William North, son of 
 Salmon North (1763–1867), son of 
 Isaac North (1729–1804), son of 
 Isaac North (1702–1788), son of 
 Thomas North (1673–1763), son of
 Thomas North (1657–1722), son of
 John North (1611–1691)

References

1794 births
1872 deaths
People from Lowell, Massachusetts
American Freemasons
Methodists from Massachusetts
People from Wethersfield, Connecticut
19th-century Methodists